Martin Cimander (born 3 October, 1981) is a German footballer who plays as a centre-back for TSV Nellmersbach.

Career
Cimander made his professional debut in the 3. Liga for Sonnenhof Großaspach on 23 May 2015, coming on as a substitute in the 83rd minute for Simon Skarlatidis in the 0–1 home loss against Arminia Bielefeld.

References

External links
 Profile at DFB.de
 Profile at kicker.de
 TSV Nellmersbach statistics at Fussball.de

1981 births
Living people
People from Ostfildern
Sportspeople from Stuttgart (region)
Footballers from Baden-Württemberg
German footballers
German football managers
Association football central defenders
SG Sonnenhof Großaspach players
3. Liga players
Regionalliga players
21st-century German people